Stay Away from Me is a 2013 Italian romantic comedy film written and directed by Alessio Maria Federici. It is a remake of the French comedy film La chance de ma vie.

Cast  
 Enrico Brignano as   Jacopo Leone
 Ambra Angiolini as   Sara
 Anna Galiena as   Lorenza Bra
 Giampaolo Morelli as  Mirko
 Fabio Troiano as   Fabrizio
 Giorgia Cardaci as   Sofia
 Giorgio Colangeli as Jacopo's father
 Gianna Paola Scaffidi as   Jacopo's mother
 Michela Andreozzi as   Silvia
 Fabrizia Sacchi as   Simona

References

External links 

2013 films
2013 romantic comedy films
Italian romantic comedy films
Italian remakes of French films
2010s Italian films
2010s Italian-language films